José Manzaneda (born 10 September 1994), is a Peruvian professional footballer who plays as a winger for Academia Deportiva Cantolao.

References

External links

1994 births
Living people
Peruvian footballers
Association football midfielders
Juan Aurich footballers
Academia Deportiva Cantolao players
Deportivo Municipal footballers
Club Alianza Lima footballers
Club Deportivo Universidad César Vallejo footballers
Peruvian Primera División players
Peru international footballers
People from Chiclayo